Gwangju AI Peppers is a South Korean women's professional volleyball team, founded in 2021. They are based in Gwangju and are members of the Korea Volleyball Federation (KOVO). Their home arena is Yeomju Gymnasium in Gwangju.

Season-by-season records

Players

2021−22 team

References

External links 
Official website 

Volleyball clubs established in 2021
Sport in Gwangju
Women's volleyball teams in South Korea
2021 establishments in South Korea